Christian La Torre (born 9 March 1990, in Comas) is a Peruvian footballer who plays as a forward.  He currently plays for Sport Huancayo in the Torneo Descentralizado.

He was part of the Peru U17 side that made it to the quarterfinals of the U17 World Cup in S. Korea.

Club career
La Torre started his career with Sport Boys, joining them in January 2006.

On 26 September 2008 La Torre signed for Universitario de Deportes.

Honours

Club
Universitario de Deportes
Torneo Descentralizado (1): 2009
U-20 Copa Libertadores (1): 2011

References

External links

1990 births
Living people
Footballers from Lima
Peruvian footballers
Sport Boys footballers
Club Universitario de Deportes footballers
José Gálvez FBC footballers
U América F.C. footballers
Sport Huancayo footballers
Peruvian Primera División players
Peruvian Segunda División players
Association football forwards